Streptomyces krungchingensis is a bacterium species from the genus of Streptomyces which has been isolated from soil from the Krung Ching Waterfall National Park in Thailand.

See also 
 List of Streptomyces species

References

External links
Type strain of Streptomyces krungchingensis at BacDive -  the Bacterial Diversity Metadatabase

 

krungchingensis
Bacteria described in 2017